Madhya Pradesh Bhoj Open University, or simply Bhoj University, is a public university in Bhopal, Madhya Pradesh, India that primarily provides higher education mainly through open and distance learning. It was named after the renowned Indian King, Raja Bhoj.

History and aim
Bhoj University was formed in 1991 under an act by the state legislature.

This university aims to spread and promote higher education among the underprivileged and has set up study centres in remote rural areas. It has collaboration with institutes like the Rehabilitation Council of India, Indian Institute of Tourism and Travel Management and Indian Institute of Material Management, etc. The university aims to provide easily accessible system of teaching and learning through education inputs like practical classes, distance teaching, satellite communication teaching, etc. Bhoj University gives special emphasis to target groups of learners coming from rural areas and especially those with disability
.

Departments 

 School of Basic Sciences
 Centre for Health Sciences
 Institute of Information Technology
 Department of Multimedia Education
 Department of Special Education
 Department of Heritage Management
 School of Management
 Electronic Media Production and Research Centre

External links
 Bhoj University homepage

Open universities in India
Universities in Bhopal
 Educational institutions established in 1991
1991 establishments in Madhya Pradesh